The Ultra-Trail Harricana of Canada, also referred to as the UTHC and formerly known as XC Harricana, is an annual trail running event founded in 2011 that takes place at the Mont Grand-Fonds ski centre,  from the town of La Malbaie, Québec. The courses make use of the ski centre's slopes as well as trails in the Traversée de Charlevoix hiking area and in the Hautes-Gorges-de-la-Rivière-Malbaie National Park. The event is a qualifying race for the Ultra-Trail du Mont-Blanc and the Western States 100. It is also one of the toughest ultra-trail races in Eastern Canada. On November 5, 2015, Ultra-Trail Harricana was named a "race of the future" by the Ultra-Trail World Tour and officially became part of the Tour in 2017.

The geographic area of Charlevoix is a unique and rich ecosystem, classified as a biosphere reserve by UNESCO. The wind carries scents of the Saint Lawrence River and the boreal forest. The trails are narrow and wind through untamed wilderness.

The UTHC's name is based on the Harricana snowmobile adventure race, one of the most prestigious races of its kind that took place in the 1990s. One of the races was a  relay from Montreal to Radisson (James Bay).

Distances 
There are eight race distances: 125 km, 80 km, 65 km, 42 km, 28 km, 10 km, 5 km and 1 km. The event is held in early September.

UTHC (Ultra-Trail Harricana of Charlevoix) 
125 km – 13,123 feet (4,000 m) of positive elevation, qualifying race for the Ultra-Trail du Mont-Blanc and the  Western States 100
80 km – 7,040 feet (2,146m) of positive elevation, qualifying race for the Ultra-Trail du Mont-Blanc
65 km – 5,905 feet (1,800 m) of positive elevation, qualifying race for the Ultra-Trail du Mont-Blanc

The UTHC was named Best Trail/Ultra Running Event in Eastern Canada in 2013, 2014 and 2015.

Harricana short trail races 
42 km – 4,593 feet (1,400 m) of positive elevation
42 km (St-Simeon) – 5,068 feet (1,545 m) of positive elevation
28 km – 3116 feet (950 m) of positive elevation
10 km – 656 feet (200 m) of positive elevation

5-km -

The other races 
Children's pirate race. The name refers to trail runner Kilian Jornet, whose nickname is the Pirate of Mont Blanc.

Results

UTHC 125km 
New course 125 km Charlevoix crossing

Old course

UTHC 80km

UTHC 65km

Harricana 42km

Harricana 42km St-Simeon

Harricana 28km

Harricana 10km

Harricana 5km

Organization and sponsors 
The Ultra-Trail Harricana relies on over 230 volunteers and 40 commercial partners from the entire province of Québec.

Ultra-Trail Harricana's founders:
 Sébastien Côté
 Geneviève Boivin
 Sébastien Boivin

Distinctions and recognitions 
 2020: Winner of the Vivats for responsible events section «Prevention and reduction at source»
 2019: Winner "Best Cross / Trail competition organization of the year" by the Quebec Athletic Federation
 2018 : Winner of the Eco-responsible Award of the Gala Charlevoix Recognizes
 2018 : Lauréat Prix Ambassadeur du Gala Charlevoix Reconnaît
 2018: Laureate of the Ambassador Award of the Gala Charlevoix Recognizes
 2018: Winner Dollard-Morin Leisure and Sports Volunteer Award
 2018: Mention in the Grand Vivat category at the competition «Les Vivats»
 2017: Nomination for the best international ultratrail race by te magazine « Territorio Trail»
 2013-2014 and 2015: Named best trail race of the year by Get Out There Magazine

References

External links 
 ultratrailharricana.com
 Results 2013-2021
 Results 2012 (5,10,28km)
 Results 2012 (1km)

Trail running competitions
Ultra-Trail World Tour
Annual sporting events in Canada
Running in Canada
Tourist attractions in Capitale-Nationale
2011 establishments in Quebec
Recurring sporting events established in 2011